Two ships of the United States Navy have been named Algorma, a Native American word meaning to fish with a torch.

Sources

References

United States Navy ship names